Lou Donaldson (born November 1, 1926) is an American retired jazz alto saxophonist. He is best known for his soulful, bluesy approach to playing the alto saxophone, although in his formative years he was, as many were of the bebop era, heavily influenced by Charlie Parker.

Life and career
Donaldson was born in Badin, North Carolina, United States. He attended North Carolina Agricultural and Technical State University in Greensboro in the early 1940s. He enlisted in the U.S. Navy during World War II and was trained at the Great Lakes bases in Chicago where he was introduced to bop music in the lively club scene.

At the war's conclusion, he returned to Greensboro, where he worked club dates with the Rhythm Vets, a combo composed of A and T students who had served in the U.S. Navy. The band recorded the soundtrack to a musical comedy featurette, Pitch a Boogie Woogie, in Greenville, North Carolina, in the summer of 1947. The movie had a limited run at black audience theatres in 1948 but its production company, Lord-Warner Pictures, folded and never made another film. Pitch a Boogie Woogie was restored by the American Film Institute in 1985 and re-premiered on the campus of East Carolina University in Greenville the following year. Donaldson and the surviving members of the Vets performed a reunion concert after the film's showing. In the documentary made on Pitch by UNC-TV, Boogie in Black and White, Donaldson and his musical cohorts recall the film's making—he originally believed that he had played clarinet on the soundtrack. A short piece of concert footage from a gig in Fayetteville, North Carolina, is included in the documentary.

Donaldson's first jazz recordings were with the Charlie Singleton Orchestra in 1950 and then with bop emissaries Milt Jackson and Thelonious Monk in 1952, and he participated in several small groups with other prominent jazz musicians such as trumpeter Blue Mitchell, pianist Horace Silver, and drummer Art Blakey.

In 1953, he also recorded sessions with the trumpet virtuoso Clifford Brown, and Philly Joe Jones. He was a member of Art Blakey's Quintet and appeared on some of their best regarded albums, including the two albums recorded at Birdland in February 1954 Night at Birdland.

He was inducted into the North Carolina Music Hall of Fame on October 11, 2012. Also in 2012, he was named a NEA Jazz Master by the National Endowment for the Arts.

In 2018, he declared himself retired, having performed his final shows in 2017. On November 2, 2021, he made a public appearance at a 95th birthday tribute show at Dizzy’s Club.

Discography

References

External links 
 Official site
 NEA Jazz Master Lou Donaldson
 All About Jazz

Signature tunes 
 
 
 

1926 births
Living people
Jazz musicians from North Carolina
People from Stanly County, North Carolina
21st-century American saxophonists
African-American saxophonists
American jazz alto saxophonists
American male saxophonists
Argo Records artists
Bebop saxophonists
Blue Note Records artists
Milestone Records artists
Muse Records artists
Hard bop saxophonists
Jazz alto saxophonists
Soul-jazz saxophonists
21st-century American male musicians
American male jazz musicians
United States Navy personnel of World War II
20th-century African-American people
21st-century African-American musicians